Sir Horace Shango Ové  (born 1936) is a Trinidad and Tobago-born British filmmaker, photographer, painter and writer. One of the leading black independent filmmakers to emerge in Britain in the post-war period, Ové holds the Guinness World Record for being the first black British filmmaker to direct a feature-length film, Pressure (1976). In its retrospective documentary, 100 Years of Cinema, the British Film Institute (BFI) declared: "Horace Ové is undoubtedly a pioneer in Black British history and his work provides a perspective on the Black experience in Britain."

Ové has built a prolific and sometimes controversial career as a filmmaker, documenting racism and the Black Power movement in Britain over many decades through photography and in films such as Baldwin's Nigger (1968), Pressure, and Dream to Change the World (2003). Ové's documentaries such as Reggae (1971) and Skateboard Kings (1978) have also become models for emerging filmmakers. He was given a knighthood in the 2022 New Year Honours for services to media.

The actress Indra Ové is his daughter, and artist Zak Ové his son.

Early years

Horace Ové was born on 3 December 1936 in Belmont, Trinidad and Tobago, where he grew up as part of a large and "somewhat bohemian family – a mixture of African, Indian, French and Spanish". As Attilah Springer has noted, he "was born into the Jones clan.... The Jones name was not theirs originally, but Ové's grandfather changed it when he wanted to open a business in downtown Port of Spain; Indian-sounding places of business were not acceptable at that time in colonial Trinidad." Ové's parents Lorna and Lawrence were the first people to open shops or cafés to help Trinidad's poor black population.

In 1960, Ové went to Britain in 1960 to study painting, photography and interior design, but went to live for a while in Rome as a painter. His entry into the film world was working as a film extra on the set of the 1963 Joseph L. Mankiewicz epic Cleopatra, starring Elizabeth Taylor, after its production moved to Rome. 

Ové returned to London, where he lived during his early years in Brixton, West Hampstead and Camden Town, marrying Irish immigrant Mary Irvine, and studying at the London School of Film Technique.

As film director

In 1966, Ové directed The Art of the Needle, a short film for the Acupuncture Association. In 1969 he made another short film, Baldwin's Nigger, in which African-American writer James Baldwin — in conjunction with civil rights activist and comedian Dick Gregory — discusses Black experience and identity in Britain and the US. Filmed at the West Indian Students' Centre in London, the film documents a lecture by Baldwin and a question-and-answer session with the audience.

Ové's next film, shot at a concert in Wembley Arena in 1970, was a documentary called Reggae, which was successful in cinemas and was shown on BBC television. Ové subsequently did other documentaries for the BBC, including King Carnival (1973, in The World About Us series), which has been acclaimed as "one of the best ever made about the history of Trinidad and Tobago Carnival". Then, in 1976, he directed the film for which he is best-known, Pressure – the first full-length drama feature film by a Black director in Britain. Telling the story of a London teenager who joins the Black Power movement in the 1970s, Pressure featured scenes of police brutality that ostensibly led to its banning for two years by its own backers, the British Film Institute, before it was eventually released to wide acclaim.

Ové's other television work has included directing A Hole in Babylon (co-written with Jim Hawkins, based on the Spaghetti House siege, featuring a cast including T-Bone Wilson, Trevor Thomas and Archie Pool), made for the BBC's Play for Today series, and first transmitted on 29 November 1979; four episodes of the pioneering series Empire Road in 1979, an episode of The Professionals ("A Man Called Quinn", 1981) and The Equalizer (shown on 8 January 1996 in the BBC series Hidden Empire), about the 1919 Amritsar Massacre, which won two Indian Academy Awards in 1996.

Ové co-wrote with H. O. Nazareth the script of the television film The Garland (1981), which led to the creation of an independent production company named Penumbra. Alongside Ové and Nazareth, other members of Penumbra Productions included Michael Abbensetts, Lindsay Barrett, Margaret Busby, Farrukh Dhondy, and Mustapha Matura.

Ové's film Playing Away (1987, with a screenplay by Caryl Phillips), starring Norman Beaton and other actors such as Joseph Marcell, Ram John Holder, Brian Bovell, and Stefan Kalipha (incidentally, Ové's cousin), centres on the residents of the fictional British village of Sneddington, who invite the "Caribbean Brixton Conquistadors" (from South London) for a cricket match to commemorate "African Famine Week".

Ové's 2003 film Dream to Change the World (edited by Pete Stern) was a documentary about the life and work of the late John La Rose, the Trinidad-born activist, publisher and writer and founder of New Beacon Books in London.

As photographer

In parallel to his career in films is Ové's photography, which has been variously exhibited internationally over the decades, including at UCLA, the British Film Institute and the University of Tübingen, Germany. In 1984 he had the first solo exhibition by a black photographer at The Photographers' Gallery, entitled Breaking Loose: Horace Ove, followed up by another exhibition focusing on his images of Trinidad Carnival, Farewell to the Flesh, at Cornerhouse in Manchester, from 28 February to 5 April 1987.

In 2001, he was invited to exhibit his works in Recontres de la Photographie in Bamako, Mali.

In 2004, the exhibition Pressure: Photographs by Horace Ové, described as "the first in-depth look at his photographic back catalogue", curated by Jim Waters and David A. Bailey, in association with Autograph ABP, toured Britain, starting at Nottingham Castle museum, moving to the University of Brighton Gallery, the Norwich Gallery, Aberystwyth Arts Centre in Wales and the Arts Depot in London. A 34-page publication by the curators contained an extract from an interview with Ové by Michael McMillian. According to a description of that exhibition:
1960's Britain was a hotbed of political and creative activity, writers and thinkers came from around the world to discuss civil rights issues and form new movements. Horace Ové was at many of the meetings and captured the events as they unfolded, including the first Black Power meeting with Stokely Carmichael, Allen Ginsberg and Michael X, founder of the black power movement in the UK with John Lennon and Yoko Ono. He also photographed figures of the period including C L R James, James Baldwin and Darcus Howe as well as Sam Selvon, Andrew Salkey and John La Rose the founding members of the Caribbean Artists' Movement. Ové also recorded the birth of the Notting Hill Carnival and charted its growth through the 1970's and 1980's from the early beginnings with the first Windrush generation to the pumping sound systems, fashions and street dancing of the younger generation. He has also recently brought his work up to date with new portraits of people like Sir Trevor MacDonald and Professor Stuart Hall.
 
Ové had an exhibition at the National Portrait Gallery, London, in 2005, as well as work exhibited at London's Victoria and Albert Museum, Tate Liverpool, the Whitechapel Gallery and a retrospective of his film and photographic work at the Barbican. His work also featured in the Tate Britain exhibition "How We Are: Photographing Britain".

Interviewed in 2010 by The Guardian about his iconic 1967 photograph of Michael X with bodyguards at Paddington Station, Ové  said: "I'm a film-maker as well as a photographer, and I live in a visual world. I've always been an active photographer – if there's anything going on socially or politically, I want to know about it. So the late 1960s and early 70s were a very busy time for me."

Ové has also photographed artist Chris Ofili in Trinidad.

As theatre director

During the course of his career Ové has also directed stage plays, including in 1973 Blackblast written by Lindsay Barrett, the first black play to be shown at London's Institute of Contemporary Arts, The Swamp Dwellers by Wole Soyinka, and in 1993 The Lion by Michael Abbensetts, for Talawa Theatre Company at the Cochrane Theatre (also on British Council tour to Jamaica, performed at the Ward Theatre, Kingston, 30 September–23 October, 3 November–13 November), starring Madge Sinclair, Stefan Kalipha and Danny Sapani.

Directing style

In terms of style as a director, Ové admits to being heavily influenced by neo-realism, having studied European filmmakers such as De Sica, Antonioni, Buñuel and Fellini during his time living in Rome. He acknowledges influences from African-American political leaders of the 1960s and 1970s such as Malcolm X and Stokely Carmichael but has been somewhat disparaging of contemporary black politics in Britain: "In black British politics there are still lot of things that are missing, that are not said."

Awards, honours and recognition

Ové has been the recipient of the Scarlet Ibis medal from the Government of Trinidad and Tobago in recognition of his international achievements in television and film, and in 1986 was named Best Director for Independent Film and Television by the British Film Institute, awarded for his "contribution to British culture".

In 2006, he was one of five winners of the £30,000 Paul Hamlyn Foundation Award for Visual Arts.

He was appointed Commander of the Order of the British Empire (CBE) in the 2007 Birthday Honours for his contributions to the film industry in the UK.

In November 2011, three young filmmakers competing on Dragons' Den as part of the 55th BFI London Film Festival Education Events, First Light, won £2000 funding and professional mentoring having successfully pitched their idea to make a short documentary about Horace Ové.

At the 2012 Trinidad and Tobago Film Festival, Ové was honoured as a "T&T Film Pioneer".

In 2013, the government of Trinidad and Tobago recognized him as a National Icon, one of "60 nationals and organizations who have personified and epitomised the strong values, fundamental beliefs, and cultural aspirations of our society".

A "Tribute to Horace Ové" was presented by Birkbeck Institute for Social Research in collaboration with Birkbeck Institute for the Moving Image on 23–24 January 2015, with screenings of his films and a symposium.

In 2017, at the 12th Screen Nation Film and Television Awards, Ové was honoured with the Edric Connor Trailblazer award.

Ové was awarded the British Independent Film Awards (BIFA) Special Jury Prize 2018, with the citation stating: "In a year where Windrush has been plastered across newspaper headlines, it seems fitting that the jury have chosen to honour one of the generation’s proudest voices."

Ové was knighted in the 2022 New Year Honours for services to media.

Influence and legacy

The 2019 Somerset House exhibition Get Up, Stand Up Now, curated by Zak Ové, celebrates 50 years of Black creativity in Britain and beyond, beginning with "Horace Ové and his dynamic circle of Windrush generation creative peers, and extending to today's brilliant young Black talent globally".

Selected filmography

 1966 – The Art of the Needle (documentary)
 1968 – Baldwin's Nigger (documentary of a lecture by James Baldwin, accompanied by Dick Gregory)
 1971 – Reggae (documentary; BBC)
 1972 – Coleherne Jazz and Keskidee Blues (documentary; BBC)
 1972 – The Black Safari (documentary; BBC Two, The World About Us)
 1973 – King Carnival (documentary; BBC)
 1973 – The Mangrove Nine (producer; directed by Franco Rosso, scripted by John La Rose)
 1976 – Pressure (feature film)
 1978 – Skateboard Kings (documentary; BBC)
 1979 – Empire Road (TV series; episodes 5, 6 and 10)
 1979 – A Hole in Babylon (BBC, Play for Today)
 1980 – Stretch Hunter
 1980 – The Latchkey Children (serial, ITV, 6 episodes)
 1981 – The Garland (BBC, Play for Today; co-written with H. O. Nazareth; starring Paul Anil, Adrian Bracken, Ishaq Bux)
 1984 – Street Art (documentary; Channel 4)
 1985 – Music Fusion (documentary, Channel 4)
 1985 – Dabbawallahs 
 1987 – Playing Away (feature film; Channel 4)
 1991 – The Orchid House (TV series, adapted from the 1953 novel of the same name by Phyllis Shand Allfrey)
 2003 – Dream To Change the World (a tribute to John La Rose)
 2007 – The Ghost of Hing King Estate

Selected exhibitions

 1984 – Breaking Loose: Horace Ove, The Photographers' Gallery

 1987 – Farewell to the Flesh, Cornerhouse, Manchester

 2004 – Pressure: Photographs by Horace Ové (touring)

Publications

  Jim Waters and David Bailey (eds), Pressure: Photographs by Horace Ove, Nottingham City Museums & Galleries, 2004.

References

Further reading

 Givanni, June, "Horace Ové – Reflection on a Thirty-Year Experience", Black Film Bulletin, Summer 1996, pp. 16–21.

External links

 
 
 Tribute to Horace Ové at thrttff/12, September 2012.
 "Horace Ove C.B.E. – Visual Arts", Ministry of the Arts and Multiculturalism, Government of the Republic of Trinidad and Tobago.
 Horace Ové page, Directors UK.
 "Ové, Horace (1939-): Film & TV credits", BFI Screenonline.
 "ScreenTalks Archive: Horace Ove", 2005 conversation with John Akomfrah. Barbican Cinema, 5 June 2017. 

1939 births
Living people
people from Port of Spain
Trinidad and Tobago emigrants to the United Kingdom
British film directors
British film producers
Photographers from London
Black British photographers
Jazz photographers
Trinidad and Tobago film directors
Commanders of the Order of the British Empire
Knights Bachelor
Trinidad and Tobago knights
British documentary film directors
Alumni of the London Film School
Black British cinema
Black British filmmakers